Öschbrig (also known as Oetlisberg) with an elevation of , is a wooded mountain in Switzerland overlooking to the east Zürichsee (Lake Zürich).

Geography 
Öschbrig is a wooded mountain located to the east of the city of Zürich, between the Glatt river valley and Lake Zürich. The mountain is part of a chain of hills — among them Käferberg, Adlisberg and Pfannenstiel — between Greifensee (Lake Greifen) and Lake Zürich.

On the western flanks of the Öschbrig is located part of the Zürich quarter of Witikon. On the slope between the north side of the mountain and the southeast side of the Adlisberg is situated the hamlet of Pfaffhausen, belonging to the gemeinde of Fällanden.

Origin of the name
Öschbrig is the Swiss German form of "Oetlisberg", which is the name given to the forest lying on the mountain. "Oetli" could be a family name or could derive from the alemannic male names Otmar or Otfrid. The name Öschbrig is first attested in 1492.

Nature
The Öschbrig is covered with a larch forest, partially destroyed by the Lothar storm in December 1999. Douglas spruces, uncommon in this region, are also present, while the clearings created by Lothar have been colonized by beeches and ashes. In the forest live among others voracious deer.

References 

Geography of Zürich
Mountains of the canton of Zürich
Mountains of Switzerland
Mountains of Switzerland under 1000 metres